Marvinbryantia is a cellulose and methylcellulose degrading bacterial genus from the family of Lachnospiraceae with one known species (Marvinbryantia formatexigens). Marvinbryantia formatexigens occurs in human feces.

References

Further reading 
 
 

 

Lachnospiraceae
Monotypic bacteria genera
Bacteria genera